Nicole Poolman is a former Republican member of the North Dakota Senate, representing the 7th district. Poolman was first elected in 2012, defeating Democrat Warren Emmer. In the 2016 North Dakota gubernatorial election, she was chosen the running mate for Attorney General Wayne Stenehjem. Poolman currently works as a high school English teacher in Bismarck.

References

External links
Official legislative website

Politicians from Bismarck, North Dakota
University of North Dakota alumni
Republican Party North Dakota state senators
Women state legislators in North Dakota
Living people
21st-century American politicians
21st-century American women politicians
Year of birth missing (living people)